"Treat You Better" is a song by Australian alternative dance group Rüfüs Du Sol, released on 9 November 2018, as the fourth and final single from the group's third studio album Solace (2018).

Upon release, the band said "It felt like a song we wrote to ourselves and to our loved ones during what was a testing time for us all personally. We were originally going to get a gospel choir for the end of this song but thought better of it when we realized we had so many talented friends with amazing voices around us. We invited them to the studio and just spent a full day playing and recording with them. It's so special to share this song with such a talented and kind-hearted group of people."

At the APRA Music Awards of 2020, "Treat You Better" was nominated for Most Performed Dance Work of the Year.

Music video
The music video for "Treat You Better" was directed by Leah Barylsky & Katzki and released on 28 February 2019.

Track listing

Charts

Weekly charts

Year-end charts

Certifications

Release history

References

2018 songs
2018 singles
Rüfüs Du Sol songs
Songs written by Jason Evigan